The Akiira One Geothermal Power Station, is a proposed  geothermal power plant in Kenya, the largest economy in the East African Community.

Location

Overview
Centum Investments, a Kenyan investment company, in conjunction with three other non-Kenyan entities, jointly plan to construct the Akiira Geothermal Power Station at a projected cost of US$300 million, using Akiira Geothermal Limited, the special-purpose company they jointly own. The power station will be developed in phases, with the first 70 megawatts coming on-line by December 2018 and the next 70 megawatts added to the national grid at a later date. In August 2015, Akiira Geothermal Limited signed a power purchase agreement with Kenya Power and Lighting Company, at a cost of 9.23 US cents per kilowatt hour.

Ownership
Akiira One Geothermal Power Station is owned by Akiira Geothermal Limited, a Kenyan limited liability company owned by Centum Investment Company Limited and three other non-Kenyan companies. The shareholding in Akiira Geothermal Limited is as depicted in the table below:

Construction funding
The total construction bill is budgeted at US $300 million (KSh30 billion). Of that, 30 percent will be sourced from shareholders while the remaining 70 percent will be borrowed from Standard Bank.  Akiira has already received a KSh86 million grant from the Overseas Private Investment Corporation (OPIC) in October 2014, as part of President Obama’s Power Africa programme. In January 2018, the European Investment Bank (EIB), offered to lend €155 million (KSh19.5 billion) on commercial terms, to fund the construction.

See also

List of power stations in Kenya 
Geothermal power in Kenya
Olkaria I Geothermal Power Station
Olkaria II Geothermal Power Station
Olkaria III Geothermal Power Station

References

External links
 The Rise of East Africa As An Alternative Energy Mecca

Geothermal power stations in Kenya
Power stations in Kenya